William Harold McMaster (15 March 1922 – 3 October 2017) was an Australian rules footballer who played with North Melbourne in the Victorian Football League (VFL).

Prior to his VFL career, he served in the Australian Army in World War II.

Notes

External links 

1922 births
Australian rules footballers from Victoria (Australia)
North Melbourne Football Club players
2017 deaths